Ante Josip "Tony" Mandarich (born September 23, 1966) is a Canadian former American football offensive tackle who played in the National Football League (NFL) for seven seasons. He was selected second overall by the Green Bay Packers in the 1989 NFL Draft and also played for the Indianapolis Colts.

Referred to as "the best offensive line prospect ever", Mandarich was highly touted during his collegiate career at Michigan State, leading to him being selected in the top five of his draft class alongside future Pro Football Hall of Fame players Troy Aikman, Barry Sanders, Derrick Thomas, and Deion Sanders. Mandarich was unable to live up to expectations, however, and was released following four seasons with the team. After five years away from football, he returned with the Colts, where he spent his last three seasons. He is the only top five pick in his draft class not inducted to the Pro Football Hall of Fame.

Football career
Mandarich was born and raised in Oakville, Ontario, Canada, the son of Croatian   immigrants. After his older brother John received a scholarship to play football at Kent State University in Kent, Ohio, John convinced his parents to allow Tony to play his senior year of high school football at Theodore Roosevelt High School in Kent to improve his chances of receiving a scholarship. Recruited to Michigan State University by defensive back coach Nick Saban, Mandarich played in the 1988 Rose Bowl and was named a First-team All-American, an Outland Award finalist and a two-time Big Ten Lineman of the Year. Upon his entry into the 1989 NFL Draft, both scouts and media (most notably Sports Illustrated, which did a cover story on him, nicknaming him "The Incredible Bulk") began trumpeting Mandarich as the best offensive line prospect ever, touting his "measurables." "He weighed 330, ran the 40 [yard dash] in 4.65 seconds, did a standing long jump of 10'3", leaped vertically 30" and bench-pressed 225 pounds an unheard-of 39 times". He appeared on the cover of Sports Illustrated twice and was also a colorful character, illustrated by such instances as challenging then–Heavyweight Boxing Champion Mike Tyson to a fight, missing scheduled public appearances due to being drunk or hungover, his well-documented love of the band Guns N' Roses (he had a dog named Axl and also a tattoo of the cross-design from the cover of Appetite for Destruction on his arm), and referring to Green Bay as "a village".

Going into the 1989 draft, Mandarich was considered one of the best prospects for an offensive lineman ever and a top-five pick. Mandarich was selected second overall by the Green Bay Packers.

Drafted as an offensive tackle, Mandarich never lived up to the stellar expectations set for him. After a lengthy holdout, which was not settled until the week before the regular-season kickoff, he spent most of his first year on the special-teams unit. He was also known for having attitude issues. He was quoted as saying: "I am not like other players, I am Tony Mandarich, and they have to understand that. If they don't like it, that is just the way I am and they are going to learn to like it." After three seasons of lackluster performance on a four-year contract, Mandarich was cut in 1992 by the Packers who cited a non-football injury.  Mandarich is often referred to as one of the top 5 bust NFL draft picks of all time, having been drafted ahead of such future NFL stars as Barry Sanders, Derrick Thomas, Deion Sanders, Steve Atwater, Eric Metcalf, and Andre Rison. The September 28, 1992, cover of Sports Illustrated featuring Mandarich labelled him "The NFL's Incredible Bust".

The question of steroid use has been discussed as a possible factor in Mandarich's spectacular failure. Mandarich did not admit his steroid use until 2008. Until then, he publicly blamed his work ethic in a 2003 Milwaukee Journal-Sentinel article: "I wanted to create as much hype as I could for many different reasons—exposure, negotiation leverage, you name it. And it all worked, except the performance wasn't there when it was time to play football."  The first Sports Illustrated cover story included allegations of steroid abuse in college, however, mentioning acne of his arms and premature balding.

After getting cut by the Packers, he went to Traverse City, Michigan, for two years, addicted to drugs and alcohol. His family checked him into a rehabilitation clinic on March 23, 1995, and he became sober.  Mandarich returned to football for three years between 1996 and 1998 with the Indianapolis Colts starting all 16 games during the 1997 season. He retired from football in 1998 due to a shoulder injury.

Post-football career
After his career was over, he moved back to Canada. He owned a golf course and remarried his wife Char in 2004.  From September 2004 until September 2005, Mandarich served as an NFL analyst for The Score TV sports network in Canada. He quit in October 2005 and moved to Arizona.

He now runs a photography studio, having begun doing nature photography as a hobby in 1990.  Mandarich has expanded his business, named Mandarich Media Group, to include photography, video production, web design, search engine optimization, and Internet marketing.

In September 2008, Mandarich admitted to using steroids at Michigan State and faking a drug test before the 1988 Rose Bowl. Mandarich has denied using steroids while in the NFL but has admitted to being addicted to alcohol and painkillers while playing for the Packers.

Tony Mandarich's older brother John made his own reputation in professional football in the Canadian Football League. John Mandarich's early death from skin cancer is documented in Tony's memoir.

In the March 2009 issue of Sports Illustrated, Mandarich spoke about his use and addiction and about his book called My Dirty Little Secrets — Steroids, Alcohol & God.  In that book, Mandarich ascribed his underwhelming performance with the Green Bay Packers to his painkiller addiction, which sapped his drive and work ethic. His addiction was such that he kept syringes in his athletic supporter to have his narcotics supply close at hand. Mandarich went on to describe his traumatic and triumphant stint in rehabilitation, and his subsequent return to the NFL. "I didn't write the book for forgiveness," Mandarich said. "I wrote the book for explanation and for, hopefully, helping somebody see the light that there is hope for addiction or alcoholism and that you can change and save your life."

In 2009, Mandarich was sued by his former girlfriend for posting explicit photographs of her online.

In 2019, ESPN broadcast an hour long documentary on Mandarich as an episode of its sports newsmagazine series E:60.

References

Bibliography

External links
 
 

1966 births
Living people
All-American college football players
American football offensive tackles
American sportspeople in doping cases
Canadian expatriate sportspeople in the United States
Canadian people of Croatian descent
Canadian players of American football
Green Bay Packers players
Indianapolis Colts players
Michigan State Spartans football players
People from Oakville, Ontario
Sportspeople from Ontario